Poliche  is a 1934 French drama film directed by Abel Gance.

Cast
 Constant Rémy as Didier Méreuil, called "Poliche"
 Marie Bell as Rosine
 Edith Méra as Mme Laub
 Violaine Barry
 Romain Bouquet as Boudier
 Alexander D'Arcy as Saint-Wast 
 Betty Daussmond as Augustine
 Marcel Delaître as Prosper Méreuil
 Pierre Finaly as Laub
 Catherine Fonteney as Louise Méreil 
 Marguerite Mahé as L'accordéoniste

References

Bibliography
 Dayna Oscherwitz & MaryEllen Higgins. The A to Z of French Cinema. Scarecrow Press, 2009.

External links

1934 films
1930s French-language films
French black-and-white films
1934 drama films
Films directed by Abel Gance
French films based on plays
French drama films
1930s French films